Michael Aubrey Walker is an American country music artist. In 2000 he was signed by DreamWorks Nashville and in 2001, he released his self-titled debut album. This album produced his only chart single in "Honey Do", which peaked at number 42 on the Billboard country charts. He also toured with Brooks & Dunn on the first annual "Neon Circus Tour" which also featured Toby Keith, Montgomery Gentry, Keith Urban and Cledus T. Judd after the release of his album, although its second through fifth singles all failed to chart. Included on the album were covers of Rodney Crowell's 1990 single "What Kind of Love", Billy "Crash" Craddock's 1974 single "Rub It In", and T. Graham Brown's 1999 single "Memphis Women and Chicken". Gary Allan also recorded the song "See If I Care" on his album of the same name, and "Honey Do" was originally recorded by Keith Harling on his 1999 album Bring It On.

In the late 2000s, Walker began performing in Branson, Missouri.

Mike Walker (2001)

Track listing
"Honey Do" (Jeffrey Steele, Al Anderson, Kent Blazy) – 3:11
"Stones in the Road" (James House, Wally Wilson) – 4:32
"This Is That" (Anderson, Tom Shapiro) – 4:01
"Who's Your Daddy?" (Frank J. Myers, Bernie Nelson) – 2:31
"See If I Care" (Jamie O'Hara) – 3:18
"What Kind of Love" (Rodney Crowell, Will Jennings, Roy Orbison) – 3:14
"It's Too Late" (House, Wilson, Drew Womack) – 3:26
"I Want a Little More" (Don Cook, Jamie Hartford, Mike Walker) – 2:26
"It's Just a Memory" (Joe Collins, Joe Doyle) – 3:05
"Long Long Kiss" (Kelly Garrett, Angela Lauer, Tim Lauer) – 2:52
"If There's a Chance to Say I Love You" (John Adrian, Dale Morris, Walker) – 3:45
"Honey Love Me That Way" (Adrian, Walker) – 3:23
"Rub It In" (Layng Martine, Jr.) – 3:00
"Memphis Women and Chicken" (Donnie Fritts, Gary Nicholson, Dan Penn) – 3:08

Personnel
 Al Anderson - acoustic guitar
 Eddie Bayers - drums
 Mark Casstevens - acoustic guitar
 Don Cook - timpani
 Smith Curry - electric dobro
 Stuart Duncan - fiddle
 Sonny Garrish - steel guitar
 Wes Hightower - background vocals
 Jim Horn - saxophone
 David Hungate - bass guitar
 John Barlow Jarvis - piano
 Jerry McPherson - electric guitar
 Brent Mason - electric guitar
 Steve Nathan - keyboards, Hammond organ
 Matt Rollings - keyboards, Hammond organ, piano
 John Wesley Ryles - background vocals
 Robby Turner - steel guitar
 Mike Walker - lead vocals
 Biff Watson - acoustic guitar
 Dennis Wilson - background vocals
 Lonnie Wilson - drums
 Glenn Worf - bass guitar

Singles

Music videos

References

External links
Official website

American country singer-songwriters
Living people
Singer-songwriters from Tennessee
DreamWorks Records artists
People from Jackson, Tennessee
Year of birth missing (living people)
Country musicians from Tennessee